Morne Fendue is a village in Saint Patrick Parish, Grenada.  It is located at the northern end of the island.

References 

Populated places in Grenada